Catholic Broadcasting Company was an Australian media company which owned various radio stations between the 1937 and the 1990s.

It was a part of the Catholic Archdiocese of Sydney.

Stations
Its flagship station, 2SM, was named after St Mark's Church in the archdiocese.

Other stations owned by the CBC included 2NX Newcastle, and 2NM Muswellbrook.

References

Defunct broadcasting companies of Australia
Companies based in Sydney
Radio stations established in 1937
Catholic Church in Australia
Mass media companies established in 1937